Anil Kumar Yadav is an Indian politician and a member of Bihar Legislative Assembly of India. He represents the Narpatganj constituency in the Araria district of Bihar. He was elected in February 2005, 2015 as a member of Rashtriya Janata Dal. He entered politics in 1974 and he also participated in the 1978 emergency. In 2020, he lost to Jai Prakash Yadav of BJP. He was elected in February 2005 as member of Bihar Legislative Assembly. He was elected two times for Bhargama block Pramukh. He was elected as chairman of Krishi Udpadan Bazar Samiti Forbisganj in 2004.

References

1960 births
Living people
Rashtriya Janata Dal politicians
Bihar MLAs 2015–2020